Henry Coyle (born 8 July 1982) is an Irish former professional boxer who competed from 2007 to 2013. As an amateur, he won the Irish welterweight championship in 2003.

Amateur career
Coyle boxed as an amateur winning the Irish welterweight title in 2003 after beating James Moore in the final at the National Boxing Stadium in Dublin.

In July 2006, Coyle won gold in boxing at the World Military Games in South Africa.

Professional career
Coyle made his professional debut on 16 March 2007 at Madison Square Garden in New York City, beating American Jason Collazo by a knockout (KO) in the first round. Coyle's second fight was a first-round technical knockout (TKO) victory against Samuel Ortiz Gomez at the Beacon Theatre on 18 May 2007. The following month, Coyle's third fight was against undefeated Omar Bell at the Hammerstein Ballroom. Coyle was knocked down, which was the first time Coyle had suffered a knockdown in his career. Before the fight was officially stopped, handing Coyle his first career loss, at just 29 seconds in the first round. On 14 September 2007, in his first fight back following the loss to Bell, Coyle stopped Robert Kimbrough by a first-round TKO. On 16 November 2007 at the Cicero Stadium in Cicero, Illinois, Coyle defeated Guy Packer by TKO in the first round.

On 15 November 2009, Coyle returned to the Breafy House in Castlebar County Mayo to make his Irish debut live on RTÉ on the undercard of Bernard Dunne fight against Cristian Faccio. Henry Coyle went the distance before receiving the referee's decision in overcoming Sergejs Savrinovics (who had lost all of his previous fights), the score cards read 78–74.

Coyle was subsequently defeated by knockout in the third round of his fight against Neil Sinclair, at the Odyssey Arena in Belfast.

Coyle claimed the vacant WBF Light Middleweight title at the Royal Theatre in Castlebar on 12 August 2011, when he beat Italy's Elio Cotena on a technical knockout. Coyle had been on top, winning each of the preceding rounds, and then in the fifth Cotena sustained an extremely deep cut just above his eye after clashing with Coyle's head and the Italian's doctor intervened.

Professional boxing record

References

External links
 

1982 births
Living people
Sportspeople from County Mayo
Irish male boxers
Light-middleweight boxers